Greatest Hits is a compilation album by American singer-songwriter Taylor Dayne. It was released on November 14, 1995 by Arista Records. Following the disappointment of Dayne’s third studio album Soul Dancing (1993), Arista released Greatest Hits to finish out Taylor’s contract. It includes the hit singles "Love Will Lead You Back", "I'll Wait", "Tell It to My Heart", and her rendition of Barry White's "Can't Get Enough of Your Love".

Since there was no new material recorded for the album, the record label decided to remix and release "Say a Prayer", a song from Soul Dancing. This was to garner more interest in the release; however, the only airplay it received was on the dance charts. "Tell It to My Heart" was remixed and re-released also, and while neither managed to chart in the US, the latter single reached No. 23 in the UK Singles Chart.

Track listings

Charts

Notes 

Taylor Dayne albums
1995 greatest hits albums
Arista Records compilation albums